The highest-selling albums and EPs in the United States are ranked in the Billboard 200, which is published by Billboard magazine. The data are compiled by Nielsen Soundscan based on each album's weekly physical and digital sales, as well as on-demand streaming and digital sales of its individual tracks. In 2015, a total of 39 albums claimed the top position of the chart. One of which, American singer-songwriter Taylor Swift's 1989 started its peak issue dated November 15, 2014. 1989 was the longest-running number-one album of the year, staying atop the chart for six weeks and was the best selling album of 2015 before Adele's 25, which managed to surpass the album's sales but after the year-end cut-off. Canadian hip hop soul artist Drake's fourth commercial release, If You're Reading This It's Too Late, became the third best-selling overall album and top-selling digital album with 535,000 digital units sold, 495,000 of which consisted of traditional whole album sales.

Other albums with extended chart runs at number one include To Pimp a Butterfly by Kendrick Lamar, Dreams Worth More Than Money by Meek Mill, Kill the Lights by Luke Bryan, Beauty Behind the Madness by The Weeknd, Traveller by Chris Stapleton and 25 by Adele; four of these albums spent two weeks at the top while the other two spent three weeks at the top position. Throughout 2015, only two acts achieved multiple number-one albums on the chart: Drake with If You're Reading This It's Too Late and What a Time to be Alive, and Future with DS2 and also What a Time to be Alive.

Albums that reached number one on the Top Album Sales chart (which takes into account purely sales and not streaming) but did not reach number one on the Billboard 200 include That's the Spirit by Bring Me the Horizon, Got Your Six by Five Finger Death Punch and Cass County by Don Henley.

Adele's 25 sold 1.9 million copies after two days of availability, and 2.3 million after three, becoming the fastest-selling album of the 21st century and the best-selling album of 2015. The album reached sales of 2.433 million early on its fourth day, surpassing the single-week record for an album since Nielsen Soundscan began tracking sales in 1991, set by NSYNC's No Strings Attached in March 2000 when it debuted with 2.416 million copies. By its fifth day, 25 had sold over 2.8 million copies, 1.45 million of which were digital sales, breaking the first-week record for a digital set. In total, it sold 3.38 million copies in the US in its first week, becoming the first album to sell over 3 million copies in a week, and only the second to sell over 2 million in a single week.

Since July 2015, the chart's tracking week began on Friday (to coincide with the Global Release Date of the music industry) and ends on Thursday.

Chart history

See also
 2015 in American music
 List of Billboard Hot 100 number-one singles of 2015

References

External links 
Current Billboard 200 chart
Billboard Chart Archives – Billboard 200 (2015)

2015
United States Albums